Axley is a surname. Notable people with the surname include:

 Cheryl Axley (born 1959), American politician and attorney
 Eric Axley (born 1974), American golfer
 Samuel Axley Smith (1822–1863), American politician

See also
 Axley Brynelson, LLP, law firm